The Boston mayoral election of 2017 was held on Tuesday, November 7, 2017, to elect the mayor of Boston, Massachusetts. Incumbent Democratic mayor Marty J. Walsh won re-election to a second term, defeating District 7 City Councilor Tito Jackson, and two long-shot candidates, Robert Cappucci and Joseph Wiley.

A non-partisan preliminary election was held on Tuesday, September 26, 2017, with Walsh and Jackson advancing into a November runoff election. In the November election, Walsh secured a landslide victory, winning by a two-to-one margin. A total of 109,034 of the city's approximately 392,000 registered voters cast a ballot in the November election. The voter turnout of 27.80% was down ten percentage points from the 2013 mayoral election, which generated more excitement as the first Boston mayoral race in a generation without an incumbent.

Candidates

Candidates who advanced to general election

Candidates eliminated in the primary

Primary election

Polling

General election

Endorsements
By October 2017, ten of the 13 Boston City Council members endorsed Walsh for re-election. Ayanna Pressley remained neutral due to her husband being employed by the mayor, and Andrea Campbell declined to comment on her preference.

The editorial boards of both of Boston's major daily newspapers endorsed Walsh, with The Boston Globe editorial board endorsing Whim for a second time, citing his success in handling housing and the city's vibrancy during his first term. The Boston Herald editorial board also endorsed Walsh, saying the newspaper was wrong not to give their endorsement to Walsh in 2013.

Polling

Results

See also
List of mayors of Boston, Massachusetts

References

External links
 
Boston Mayor Race – Nov 07, 2017 at ourcampaigns.com

Mayoral election
Boston mayoral
Boston
Mayoral elections in Boston
Non-partisan elections
Boston mayoral election